The Kristiania match workers strike was an industrial dispute involving female match workers at the factories Bryn and Grønvold in Kristiania in 1889. The strike started when the wages were suddenly reduced by 20% in October 1889, and involved 372 of the female workers. It ended 13 December the same year. The strike attracted considerable public sympathy, including from Bjørnstjerne Bjørnson and Oscar Nissen. 

The conflict received country-wide publicity. The strike started spontaneously on 24 October, without any leadership or organizers. The editor of Social-Demokraten, Carl Jeppesen, and Oscar Nissen helped organize a meeting among the workers. The number of strikers were 266 packers from Grønvolds fyrstikkfabrikk and 102 from Bryn. Among the outside supporters were the feminist pioneers Fernanda Nissen and Ragna Nielsen. Bjørnstjerne Bjørnson appeared as speaker at public mass meetings, along with Jeppesen and Oscar Nissen. The strike went on for weeks, while the workers received financial support from fund-raising campaigns. There was, however, little movement in the negotiations between the workers and the factory owners, and the strike was declared terminated 12 December 1889. 

The strike's only achievement was a somewhat lighter fine system, but the conflict eventually had implications for the emerging labour movement. It was later treated in Olav Dalgard's film Gryr i Norden from 1939.

References

1889 in Norway
1889 labor disputes and strikes
Labour disputes in Norway